"Come See Me" produced by Tim & Bob, is the second single released from 112's debut album of the same name. Slim leads the song, which features rapper Mr. Cheeks.

Weekly charts

References 

1996 songs
Bad Boy Records singles
112 (band) songs
Songs written by Bob Robinson (songwriter)
Songs written by Tim Kelley
Song recordings produced by Tim & Bob
1996 singles
Songs written by Mr. Cheeks